Urbina is a Basque (Spanish) surname. Notable people with the surname include:

Abraham Alvarenga Urbina (born 1974), Honduran lawyer and politician
Carlo Urbina (16th century), Italian painter, active in Crema
Jorge Urbina (born 1946), the Permanent Representative to the United Nations for Costa Rica
José de Urbina y Urbina, 3rd conde de Cartaojal (1761–1833), Spanish general during the Revolutionary and Napoleonic Wars
María Lavalle Urbina (1908–1996), Mexican lawyer and politician, first female president of the Mexican Senate
Marcos Urbina (born 1985), defender currently playing for the club Monarcas Morelia
Oscar Urbina Ortega (born 1947), Colombian prelate of the Roman Catholic Church
Rafael Simon Urbina (born 1899), Venezuelan rebel fighting against the dictatorial regime of Juan Vicente Gomez
Ricardo M. Urbina (born 1946), United States District Court Judge in Washington, DC
Silvia Urbina, Chilean singer and researcher in folkloric music of Chile
Susana Urbina (born 1946), Peruvian-American psychologist
Tomás Urbina (c. 1877 – 1915), general in the Mexican Revolution
Ugueth Urbina (born 1974), former relief pitcher in Major League Baseball
Ian Urbina (born  March 29, 1972), investigative reporter for The New York Times

References

Basque-language surnames